Herminio Dagohoy, O.P., is the 96th Rector Magnificus of the University of Santo Tomas (UST), the oldest and the largest Catholic university in Manila, Philippines.

Early years and education
Dagohoy was born on July 8, 1964 in Hagonoy, Bulacan. He joined the Order of Preachers on May 10, 1988 after finishing Accountancy at the Polytechnic University of the Philippines in 1985. He was ordained to the priesthood on Sept. 28, 1994 at the Sto. Domingo Church.

He obtained degrees in Philosophy from the Philippine Dominican Center of Institutional Studies in 1990 and Theology at the UST Faculty of Sacred Theology in 1993. He received his MA degree in Philippine Studies from the University of the Philippines Diliman in 2000, a Licentiate in Philosophy at the UST Faculty of Philosophy in 2011, and a PhD degree at UST in 2012.

His areas of specialization include Ancient Philosophy, Theodicy, Social Philosophy, and Hermeneutics. Dagohoy was the former prior of the Santo Domingo Convent in Quezon City and the Priory of St. Thomas Aquinas in UST.

Career
He was the former director for finance and administration of UST Hospital. He also served as the 9th Rector and President of Angelicum College in Quezon City.

References

Academic staff of the University of Santo Tomas
1964 births
Living people
People from Bulacan
Polytechnic University of the Philippines alumni
University of the Philippines Diliman alumni
Rector Magnificus of the University of Santo Tomas